This is a chronological list of Steaua București managers, comprising all those who have held the position of manager for the first team of Steaua București. In the Liga I the club has appointed 38 managers; including pre-league managers and temporary caretakers.

The longest serving manager was Anghel Iordănescu, who was in charge from 1986 to 1990, a period of 3 years and 8 months. The most successful Steaua București manager in terms of major trophies won is Emerich Jenei, who won nine trophies.

Managers

References

Footnotes

FC Steaua Bucuresti managers
Steaua Bucuresti